The 2022 Sofia Open was a tennis tournament to be played on indoor hard courts. It was the 7th edition of the Sofia Open as part of the ATP World Tour 250 series of the 2022 ATP Tour. It was played at the Arena Armeec in Sofia, Bulgaria, from 26 September to 2 October 2022.

Champions

Singles 

  Marc-Andrea Hüsler def.  Holger Rune, 6–4, 7–6(10–8)

Doubles 

  Rafael Matos /  David Vega Hernández def.  Fabian Fallert /  Oscar Otte, 3–6, 7–5, [10–8]

Singles main-draw entrants

Seeds

1 Rankings are as of 19 September 2022.

Other entrants
The following players received wildcards into the main draw: 
  Dimitar Kuzmanov 
  Alexandar Lazarov
  Stan Wawrinka

The following players received entry from the qualifying draw:
  Geoffrey Blancaneaux
  Ugo Humbert 
  Dragoș Nicolae Mădăraș
  Jan-Lennard Struff

The following player received entry as a lucky loser:
  Mirza Bašić

Withdrawals
  Alexander Bublik → replaced by  Fernando Verdasco
  Roberto Carballés Baena → replaced by  Dušan Lajović
  Alejandro Davidovich Fokina → replaced by  Marc-Andrea Hüsler
  Jack Draper → replaced by  Mirza Bašić
  Hubert Hurkacz → replaced by  Nuno Borges
  Filip Krajinović → replaced by  Mikael Ymer
  Gaël Monfils → replaced by  Kamil Majchrzak
  Stan Wawrinka → replaced by  Aleksandar Vukic

Doubles main-draw entrants

Seeds

1 Rankings are as of 19 September 2022.

Other entrants
The following pairs received wildcards into the doubles main draw:
  Alexander Donski /  Alexandar Lazarov  
  Yanaki Milev /  Petr Nesterov

The following pair received entry as alternates:
  Jack Vance /  Jamie Vance

Withdrawals
  Alexander Bublik /  Lorenzo Musetti → replaced by  Jack Vance /  Jamie Vance
  Roberto Carballés Baena /  Bernabé Zapata Miralles → replaced by  Marc-Andrea Hüsler /  Bernabé Zapata Miralles

References

External links 
Official website
Tournament page at ATPWorldTour.com

Sofia Open
Sofia Open
Sofia Open
Sofia Open
Sofia Open